Pabellón Jorge Garbajosa, formerly known as Pabellón Parque Corredor, is an indoor arena located in Torrejón de Ardoz, Community of Madrid, Spain. It is mainly used by Inter Movistar for its futsal games.

History
Opened in 1996, in June 2006, the arena changed its name in homage of basketball player Jorge Garbajosa, born in Torrejón de Ardoz.

In July 2015, Inter FS decided to come back to Pabellón Jorge Garbajosa twelve years later since the futsal club left the arena for playing at Alcalá de Henares.

References

External links
 Pabellón Jorge Garbajosa at Torrejón de Ardoz Sports Department website

Garbajosa
Sports venues in the Community of Madrid
Sport in Torrejón de Ardoz
Buildings and structures in Torrejón de Ardoz